Kim F. Coates (born February 21, 1958) is a Canadian–American actor who has worked in both Canadian and American films and television series. He has worked on Broadway portraying Stanley Kowalski in A Streetcar Named Desire and in the lead role of Macbeth performed at the Stratford Shakespeare Festival. He is best known for his role as Alexander "Tig" Trager in the FX series Sons of Anarchy and as Declan Gardiner in the Citytv series Bad Blood, as well as his recurring roles in Prison Break, Cold Case, CSI and CSI: Miami. He has also had film roles in The Last Boy Scout (1991), Bad Boys (1995), King of Sorrow (2006), Goon (2011).

Early life and career 
Coates was born in Saskatoon, Saskatchewan, Canada, to Frederick "Fred" and Joyce Coates. He first saw a play while attending the University of Saskatchewan, where he enrolled in a drama course as an elective. This experience inspired him to pursue an acting career. Coates portrayed Stanley Kowalski in A Streetcar Named Desire and was the youngest ever to play the title role of Macbeth at the Stratford Festival in his native Canada. Coates made his screen debut in the film The Boy in Blue (1986). This role opened up opportunities for him, and he has appeared in over 100 titles to date.

In 2018 he had his first stage role in almost thirty years, playing Johnny "Rooster" Byron in the Outside the March production of Jez Butterworth's play Jerusalem. He won the Dora Mavor Moore Award for Outstanding Performance by a Male in a Principal Role – Play (Large Theatre) at the 2018 Dora Awards.

At the 7th Canadian Screen Awards, Coates won the award for Best Actor in a Continuing Leading Dramatic Role for his performance as gangster Declan Gardiner in the television series Bad Blood.

Philanthropy

Coates supports the One Heart Source, a non profit organization aiming at ending poverty by designing high quality global initiatives focused on education and health.

Coates participates in Rally for Kids events in support for The Pinball Clemons Foundation.

Personal life
Coates has both Canadian and American citizenship.

Coates lives in Los Angeles, California with his wife, Diana Chappell, and two children, Kyla and Brenna. He is known to be good friends with Prison Break co-star William Fichtner, as well as Kevin Costner and Sons of Anarchy co-star Theo Rossi. Coates became a United States citizen in 2010.

On June 6, 2017, Coates received an honorary doctorate at the University of Saskatchewan.

Filmography

Film

Television

References

External links

 
 
 

University of Saskatchewan alumni
Male actors from Saskatoon
20th-century American male actors
20th-century Canadian male actors
21st-century American male actors
21st-century Canadian male actors
Canadian emigrants to the United States
Canadian male film actors
Canadian male television actors
Canadian male voice actors
Canadian male stage actors
Living people
American male film actors
American male television actors
American male voice actors
American male stage actors
Dora Mavor Moore Award winners
Best Actor in a Drama Series Canadian Screen Award winners
Sons of Anarchy
1958 births